Devil’s Peak (originally titled: Where All Light Tends to Go) is a 2023 American crime thriller film directed by Ben Young and starring Billy Bob Thornton and Robin Wright.  It is based on the novel, Where All Light Tends To Go, by David Joy.

It was released on February 17, 2023 in select theaters before releasing on digital on February 24, 2023. The film received negative reviews with criticism due towards Hopper Penn’s performance as the lead, while Billy Bob Thornton and Robin Wright were given praise.

Cast
Billy Bob Thornton
Robin Wright
Hopper Penn
Emma Booth
Brian d'Arcy James
Jackie Earle Haley
Harrison Gilbertson
Katelyn Nacon
David Kallaway

Production
Filming began in Atlanta, Georgia on November 1, 2021.

Reception
On Rotten Tomatoes, the film holds an approval rating of 42% based on 19 reviews, with an average rating of 5.1/10. On Metacritic, which uses a weighted average, the film has a score of 38 out of 100 based on 8 critics, indicating "generally unfavorable reviews".

In a review for Variety, Murtada Elfadl praised the film’s performances and characters, but says it “crumbles due to Penn’s inexperienced performance,” further noting Wright’s “dedication” and Thornton’s monologues which “he gnaws on with relish.” Brian Tallerico for RogerEbert.com gave the film 1 out of 4 stars, considering the film overall “atrocious,” Penn’s performance “a dour, non-performance that becomes a black hole in the center,” Thornton playing a “cartoonish version of menace,” and an “excellent” Wright underutilized due to her character.

References

External links
 

2023 films
American crime thriller films
Films based on American novels
Films shot in Atlanta